Pseudonitschkia is a genus of fungi in the class Dothideomycetes. The relationship of this taxon to other taxa within the class is unknown (incertae sedis). A monotypic genus, it contains the single species Pseudonitschkia parmotrematis. This was first found growing on rock in Venezuela and the holotype specimen is in the collection of the Natural History Museum, London.

See also 
 List of Dothideomycetes genera incertae sedis

References

Dothideomycetes enigmatic taxa
Monotypic Dothideomycetes genera
Taxa named by Sergey Kondratyuk
Taxa described in 1995
Taxa named by Brian John Coppins